Truro Boscawen was an electoral division of Cornwall in the United Kingdom which returned one member to sit on Cornwall Council between 2009 and 2021. It was abolished at the 2021 local elections, being succeeded by Truro Boscawen and Redannick and Truro Moresk and Trehaverne.

Councillors

Extent
Truro Boscawen represented almost the whole of the centre of Truro, including Truro Cathedral and the Royal Cornwall Museum, as well as the north of the city, including Tregurra, Moresk and most of Daubuz Moors (a small part of which was covered by the Truro Trehaverne division). Despite its name, it did not cover Boscawen Park which was entirely within the neighbouring Truro Tregolls division.

The division was abolished and reformed during boundary changes at the 2013 election. The 2009-2013 division had represented the parts of Truro south of the city centre. At the 2013, it switched to generally covering the area north of the city centre, with Truro Redannick covering most of its former area. Before the boundary changes, the division covered 280 hectares in total; afterwards, it covered 164 hectares.

Election results

2017 election

2013 election

2009 election

References

Electoral divisions of Cornwall Council
Politics of Truro